Revans may refer to:

People
 John Revans, secretary to the English Poor Law Commission
 Reg Revans (1907–2003), academic who pioneered the use of action learning
 Samuel Revans (1807–1888), New Zealand newspaper owner, entrepreneur, and politician

Other
 Revans University, an online unaccredited degree-awarding body

See also
 Revan (disambiguation)